Cowley County is one of the 141 Cadastral divisions of New South Wales. It contains the locality of Cavan. It was originally bordered on the north, east and part of the south by the Murrumbidgee River, and on the west by the Goodradigbee River. A large part of the county was transferred to the Commonwealth to make the Australian Capital Territory in 1909, with the remaining part the area to the north-west of the ACT as far north as the Burrinjuck Dam, and thin strips of land along the western, southern and south-eastern borders of the ACT.

Cowley County is named in honour of Henry Richard Charles Wellesley, First Earl Cowley (1804-1884).

Parishes within this county
A full list of parishes found within this county including the 15 former parishes which are now part of the ACT; their current LGA and mapping coordinates to the approximate centre of each location is as follows:

References

County of Cowley and Co. Buccleuch New South Wales, 1871 map, National Library of Australia
Districts Act 1966

Counties of New South Wales